The UEFA Women's Cup 2001–02 was the first edition of the women's football UEFA European club competition. It took place during the 2001–02 season, from August 2001 to May 2002.

The competition was won by German Bundesliga side 1. FFC Frankfurt, who beat Sweden's Umeå IK by a score of 2–0, in the single-leg 2002 UEFA Women's Cup Final.

Qualifying round

Group stage

Group 1

Group 2

Group 3

Group 4

Group 5

Group 6

Group 7

Group 8

Quarter-finals

First leg

Second leg

Semi-finals

First leg

Second leg

Final

Top goalscorers

External links
2001-02 season at UEFA website
 UEFA Women's Cup results at RSSSF

References

Women's Cup
2001-02
UEFA
UEFA